4 Vulpeculae is a single, orange-hued star in the northern constellation of Vulpecula. It forms part of the asterism, formerly thought to be an open cluster, called the coathanger or Brocchi's Cluster. The star is faintly visible to the naked eye with an apparent visual magnitude of 5.16.

At the age of about 2.6 billion years old, this is an aging giant star with a stellar classification of K0 III, having exhausted the supply of hydrogen at its core and evolved off the main sequence. It is now a red clump giant, indicating that it is on the horizontal branch and is generating energy through the fusion of helium at its core. The star has an estimated 1.72 times the mass of the Sun and has expanded to 11.42 times the Sun's radius. It is radiating 67.6 times the Sun's luminosity from its enlarged photosphere at an effective temperature of 4,763 K.

References

K-type giants
Horizontal-branch stars
Vulpecula
Durchmusterung objects
Vulpeculae, 04
182762
095498
7385